Kathleen Marshall (born September 28, 1962) is an American director, choreographer, and creative consultant.

Life and career
Born in Madison, Wisconsin, she graduated from Taylor Allderdice High School in Pittsburgh, Pennsylvania, in 1980 and Smith College in 1985. She worked in the Pittsburgh theatre scene when she was younger, performing with such companies as Pittsburgh Civic Light Opera. She began her Broadway career as an assistant to her brother Rob, the choreographer of Kiss of the Spider Woman, in 1993. The two also collaborated on She Loves Me (1993), Damn Yankees (1994), Victor/Victoria (1995) and Seussical (2000). She was the artistic director for the Encores! series of staged musical revivals from 1996 through 2000. During that time, she choreographed The Boys from Syracuse, Li'l Abner and Call Me Madam and both directed and choreographed Babes in Arms and Wonderful Town.

Marshall was a judge on the NBC reality series Grease: You're the One That I Want!. Viewers' votes selected the stars of the August 2007 Broadway revival of Grease, which she directed and choreographed.

The Encores! production of Wonderful Town transferred to Broadway in November 2003 and ran until January 2005, with both direction and choreography by Marshall. She was nominated for the Tony Award for Best Direction of a Musical and Best Choreography, and won for Best Choreography. She was the director and choreographer of the Broadway revival of Pajama Game which opened in February 2006 and which was the Broadway acting debut of Harry Connick Jr.

Marshall directed and choreographed a Broadway revival of Cole Porter's Anything Goes beginning in April 2011, with Sutton Foster starring as Reno Sweeney. Marshall was nominated for the Tony Award for both directing and choreography and won for choreography. She was the director and choreographer of the musical Nice Work If You Can Get It which opened on Broadway in April 2012.

She directed the musical adaptation of the film, Ever After, on Broadway in the 2015-16 musical theatre season.

She directed the new television movie of Once Upon a Mattress which was broadcast on ABC in December 2005.

In 2021, Marshall served as the director and choreographer for the London revival of Anything Goes at the Barbican Theatre. For her work in the production, she won the Laurence Olivier Award for Best Theatre Choreographer.

Personal
In February 2009, Marshall received the Smith College Medal in honor of her work.

Marshall and Scott Landis, a producer and former agent, were married in September 2009. They have two children, Ella and Nathaniel, twins, who were born in May 2010.

Stage productions
Source: Internet Broadway Database

Swinging on a Star (1995) – choreographer
1776 (1997) – choreographer
Kiss Me, Kate (1999) – choreographer
Ring Round the Moon (1999) – choreographer
Follies (2001) – choreographer
Wonderful Town (2003) – director/choreographer
Little Shop of Horrors (2003) – choreographer
Two Gentlemen of Verona (2005) - director/choreographer, Public Theater
The Pajama Game (2006) – director/choreographer
Grease (2007) director/choreographer
Calvin Berger (2010) director/choreographer, George Street Playhouse, New Brunswick, New Jersey
Anything Goes (2011) director/choreographer
Nice Work If You Can Get It (2012) director/choreographer
In Transit, (2016) director/choreographer
 Anything Goes (2021) Director & Choreographer (Barbican Theatre London Revival)

Awards and nominations

References

External links
 
 
Kathleen Marshall – Downstage Center interview

1962 births
Living people
American choreographers
American theatre directors
Drama Desk Award winners
Laurence Olivier Award winners
Artists from Pittsburgh
Tony Award winners
Smith College alumni
Women theatre directors
Taylor Allderdice High School alumni
People from Madison, Wisconsin